Waywordwonderwill is the debut solo album by Jewish rapper Eprhyme, released on September 8, 2009 through Shemspeed Records. It was produced by Smoke M2D6 of Oldominion. The album's two singles, "Punklezmerap" and "Shomer Salaam", were originally released by K Records as part of its International Pop Underground series, marking the label's first hip hop releases in more than ten years. A release party for the album was held in New York's East Village.

Track listing

Personnel
Eprhyme – primary artist
Nomy Lamm, Stephanie Schief, Shir Yaakov – additional vocals
Smoke M2D6, Paul Schrag, Sunday Grip – production
Seth Kushner – photography

References

External links 
 Waywordwonderwill on Bandcamp

Eprhyme albums
2009 debut albums
Shemspeed Records albums